Never Too Late may refer to:

Books 
 Never Too Late: My Musical Life Story, a 1979 autobiographical novel by John Caldwell Holt
 Never Too Late: A Prosecutor’s Story of Justice in the Medgar Evers trial, a 2001 book by Bobby DeLaughter

Film and theatre
 Never Too Late (play), a 1962 Broadway play
 Never Too Late (1925 film), an American silent comedy action film
 Never Too Late (1935 film), an American film
 Never Too Late (1937 film), the U.S. release title of It's Never Too Late to Mend
 Never Too Late (1965 film), a film directed by Bud Yorkin, based on the play
 Never Too Late (1996 film), a Canadian drama/comedy film
 Never Too Late (2020 film), an Australian comedy film

Music

Albums
 Never Too Late (Status Quo album) and the title track, 1981
 Never Too Late (Sammi Cheng album), 1992
 Never Too Late (Mario album)
 Never Too Late (Jimi Jamison album), 2012
 Never Too Late, a Hedley compilation album of singles

Songs
 "Never Too Late" (Hedley song), 2008
 "Never Too Late" (Kylie Minogue song), 1989
 "Never Too Late" (Sinitta song), 1983
 "Never Too Late" (Three Days Grace song), 2006
 "Never Too Late", song from Rise by The Answer

Other
 Never Too Late (horse),  Thoroughbred racehorse
 Never Too Late (radio series),  a BBC radio sitcom

See also
 It's Never Too Late (disambiguation)